South Hobart is one of Hobart's inner suburbs. It is bound by Dynnyrne, Fern Tree, West Hobart and the Hobart City Centre.

Landmarks
South Hobart is home to many of the most beautiful homes in Hobart, including the classical Georgian residence of Milton and the Henry Hunter-designed Ashleigh (which was owned by Alfred Totenhöfer).

"The World Heritage-listed Cascades Female Factory Historic Site in South Hobart is Australia’s most significant site associated with female convicts and sits in the shadow of Mount Wellington, a short distance from the Hobart CBD."

"From 1828 to 1856, the Cascades Female Factory operated as a purpose-built institution intended to reform female convicts. More than 5,000 women convicts are known to have spent time here.

The Cascades Female Factory was originally established on the site of a failed rum distillery which was adapted and gradually expanded to comprise five conjoined, rectangular walled yards.

After 1856, the site was used for a variety of institutional purposes before being sold in 1904 and subdivided."

The Cascade Brewery, the oldest brewery in Australia, is located here.

Another landmark is All Saints' Anglican Church. Established in 1858, it is heritage listed. The building was designed by the prominent architect Henry Hunter.

The Church is also renowned for containing a memorial plaque for school teacher and founder of women's cricket in Australia, Lily Poulett-Harris.

South Hobart is also famous for its Keen's Curry sign.  Originally, the sign read "VR 60" to mark the Jubilee of Queen Victoria. This was created when the son-in-law of the company's founder "purchased land in the foothills of Mount Wellington, overlooking Hobart, and in 1905 transformed it into a large advertising sign. Heavy stones were collected from the site, painted white and used to form the words 'Keen's Curry' in letters some fifty feet (15 m) high. Public uproar resulted, but Horace won the right to use it as an advertising sign. In June 1926 the familiar landmark briefly changed to read 'Hell's Curse' as a university prank, and students altered it again in 1962 to promote a theatre production. In 1994 the landmark read 'No Cable Car' as a protest against a proposed development. After every change the sign was restored and as of 2012 was still in place."

Culture
The area is known for its high green vote which is reflected by the existence of a community sustainability network. This is coordinated through a community. There is a strong sense of community, in part created by the suburb's location.  It has an active community association – The South Hobart Progress Association Inc. founded in 1922 making it one of the oldest such organisations in Tasmania.
All Saints' Anglican Church is today known for being Hobart's centre of Anglo-Catholic worship.

The suburb is home to the very successful South Hobart SC.

Known as 'SoHo (South Hobart) village' by locals.

The Cascade Hotel is host to the weekly Gypsy Jazz Jam session, every Wednesday, for locals and visiting artists.

History
Upper Macquarie Street Post Office opened on 1 April 1874. It was renamed Cascade Road in 1884 and Hobart South in 1895.

Utilities
Huon Road runs through South Hobart and is an extension of Davey Street (formerly Holbrook Place).  Huon Road used to be named "The Huon Highway" and was the major road to the Huon Valley until the opening of the Southern Outlet during the latter half of the 20th century.  Autumn time during the 1950s would see apple trucks continually travelling along this road carting apples to Europe, thus helping Tasmania to earn its title of "The Apple Isle".

A refuse tip is located here within McRobies Gully.

Notable residents
Richard Flanagan (1961-) – author
Haughton Forrest Cpt. (1826–1925) – artist
John Skinner Prout (1805–1876) – colonial artist
Morton Allport (1830–1878) – photographer

References

Localities of City of Hobart